Maghan I (1280s – 1341) was a mansa of the Mali Empire, following his father Kankan Musa I's death in 1337. Aside from legendary founder Sundiata, Kankan Musa I is generally regarded as the most successful of the Malian emperors, and Maghan inherited the empire at the height of its glory. He reigned for only four years before being succeeded by his uncle Suleyman in 1341.

See also
 Keita Dynasty

1341 deaths
Mansas of Mali
14th-century monarchs in Africa
Year of birth unknown
Keita family